T. nepalensis may refer to:

 Tayloria nepalensis, a dung moss
 Tostkar nepalensis, a ground beetle
 Trigonotoma nepalensis, a ground beetle